Thomas Arthur Dean (21 November 1920 – 4 June 2004) was an English cricketer. Dean was a right-handed batsman who bowled leg break googly.

Dean made his first-class debut for Hampshire in the 1939 County Championship against Somerset. In the 1939 season, Dean took his first five-wicket haul against Yorkshire, with figures of 5/58 in Yorkshire's second innings. The Championship match against Yorkshire was Dean's last before the start of the Second World War.

After the war, Dean returned to playing for Hampshire. Dean's return match came against the Worcestershire in the 1946 County Championship. Dean took his only ten wicket haul in a match against Derbyshire, where Dean took his career best figures of 7/51, to give him match figures of 10/129.

From 1946 to 1949 Dean played a further 25 matches for the county, with his final match for Hampshire coming against Kent in the 1949 County Championship. In his 28 first-class matches for Hampshire, Dean scored 283 runs at an average of 9.12, with a high score of 26. With the ball Dean took 51 wickets at a bowling average of 31.11, with best figures of 7/51, one of Dean's three four wicket hauls.

In 1954 Dean joined Devon, where he represented the county in the 1954 Minor Counties Championship. Dean made his debut for Devon against Cornwall and played in four Minor Counties matches for the county, with Dean's final Minor Counties match coming against the Surrey Second XI.

Dean left Devon at the end of the 1954 season and shortly after moved to South Africa, where in 1956 he represented Eastern Province in a single first-class match against Border.

Dean died at Alexandria, Eastern Cape on 4 June 2004.

External links
Thomas Dean at Cricinfo
Thomas Dean at CricketArchive
Matches and detailed statistics for Thomas Dean

1920 births
2004 deaths
People from Gosport
English cricketers
Hampshire cricketers
Devon cricketers
Eastern Province cricketers
British emigrants to South Africa